The 1988–89 DFB-Pokal was the 46th season of the annual German football cup competition. It began on 6 August 1988 and ended on 24 June 1989. 64 teams competed in the tournament of six rounds. In the final Borussia Dortmund defeated Werder Bremen 4–1.

Matches

First round

Replays

Second round

Replays

Round of 16

Quarter-finals

Semi-finals

Final

References

External links
 Official site of the DFB 
 Kicker.de 

1988-89
1988–89 in German football cups